Indukurupeta is a village and a mandal in Nellore district in the state of Andhra Pradesh in India. It is located in Kovur (Assembly constituency).

Geography
It has an average elevation of 4 meters (16 feet). Indukurupeta is located approximately 15km east from district headquarters Nellore. Area of the mandal is 144sq.Km approximately.

Climate and soil
The climate of Indukurupeta is hot and humid in summer and cold in rainy and winter seasons. Soils are black cotton and sandy loams.

Panchayats
Indukurupeta comprises 20 panchayats:
 Devispeta
 Gangapatnam
 Indukurpet Bit-II (Kothuru)
 Indukurpet Bit-I
 Jangamvanidoruvu
 Komarika
 Koruturu
 Kothuru-Chinthopu
 Kudithipalem
 Leburu Bit-I
 Leburu Bit-II
 Mudivarthipalem
 Mypadu
 Narasapuram
 Nidimusali
 Pallipadu
 Punnur
 Ramudupalem
 Ravur
 Somarajupalli

The mandal revenue office is situated in Kothuru. There are 16 major villages, 64 hamlets and 16,687 households in the mandal. There is rural police station, 30 bed primary health care center, veterinary hospital in mandal headquarters Indukurupeta.

Population
As per 2011 census total population of this mandal is 58543 out of which 29,075 being male and 29468 female. Sex ratio is 1014(females per 1000 males), while sex ratio between 0-6 years age is 937(females per male). Literacy rate is 65.4%. (Male-71.1% and Female-59.7%).

Economy
Most of the people rely on farming, cattle and sheep rearing, agriculture, building & daily labor, street vendors and priests. Since rice and other crops grow abundantly, there are many rice and dal mills in the mandal. Also many marine export companies are present, as there are many fish and prawn ponds in the mandal. Marine products are mainly exported Chennai and thereby to other international destinations.

Tourism 
Many famous temples are located in and around Indukurupeta mandal, including Gangapatnam Chamundeswari Ammavaru, Leburu Kunkalamma, Kothuru Saibaba, Lalithamaheswari Ashramam, and Mypadu Shivalayam. Mypadu Beach is also located in this mandal. The mandal hosts several movie theaters and recreational clubs.

Transport
The nearest railway station is in Nellore. APSRTC buses are available from Atmakur bus station in Nellore. Many autos and private vehicles are also available. The nearest airports are in Kadapa, Chennai and Vijayawada.

References 

Villages in Nellore district

http://www.dataforall.org/dashboard/censusinfoindia_pca/ 
https://spsnellore.ap.gov.in/grama-panchayats/
http://www.apsdps.ap.gov.in/pages/weather_observations/soil_moisture.html
https://cdn.s3waas.gov.in/s39c82c7143c102b71c593d98d96093fde/uploads/2019/07/2019072494-1.pdf